Filmon Tseqay (born is an Eritrean footballer. He currently plays for the Eritrea national football team.

International career
Tseqay played in the 2009 CECAFA Cup in Kenya, scoring in the 3–1 victory against Somalia.

References

External links
 

Living people
1993 births
Eritrean footballers
Eritrea international footballers
Association football midfielders
Mai Temenai FC players
Sportspeople from Asmara
Eritrean Premier League players